The 2012 Sioux Falls Storm season was the team's thirteenth season as a professional indoor football franchise and fourth in the Indoor Football League (IFL). One of fourteen teams competing in the IFL for the 2012 season, the Storm were members of the United Conference.

Led by head coach Kurtiss Riggs, the Storm played their home games at the Sioux Falls Arena in Sioux Falls, South Dakota. Sioux Falls entered the 2012 season following winning in the league's "United Bowl" championship game in 2011.

Schedule
Key:

Regular season
All start times are local time

Post-season

Roster

Standings

References

External links
Sioux Falls Storm official statistics
2012 IFL regular season schedule

Sioux Falls Storm
Sioux Falls Storm
Sioux Falls Storm
United Bowl champion seasons